Larry Pinkard (born February 25, 1992) is an American football wide receiver who is currently a free agent. He played college football at Old Dominion. He was originally signed as an undrafted free agent by the Green Bay Packers. He has also played for the Oakland Raiders, Jacksonville Jaguars, and Cleveland Browns.

Professional career

Green Bay Packers
Pinkard was signed by the Green Bay Packers as an undrafted free agent on May 8, 2015. He was waived/injured on September 5, 2015 and placed on injured reserve. He was released on September 14, 2015.

Oakland Raiders
On December 15, 2015, Pinkard was signed to the Oakland Raiders' practice squad.

Jacksonville Jaguars
On April 17, 2017, Pinkard was signed by the Jacksonville Jaguars. He was waived on September 1, 2017. He was signed to the practice squad on September 12, 2017. He was promoted to the active roster on November 18, 2017. He was waived/injured on December 23, 2017 and was placed on injured reserve. On February 23, 2018, he was waived by the Jaguars.

Cleveland Browns
On February 26, 2018, Pinkard was claimed off waivers by the Cleveland Browns. He was waived by the Browns less than two months later, on April 12.

Personal life
His parents are Larry Green and Michele Pinkard-Green. He has four siblings, two sisters, Lashelle and LaTonya, and two brothers, Jacqua and Ayinde. He majored in sports management.

References

External links
Old Dominion Monarchs bio
Green Bay Packers bio
Oakland Raiders bio
Jacksonville Jaguars bio

1992 births
Living people
People from Washington, D.C.
Players of American football from Washington, D.C.
American football wide receivers
Old Dominion Monarchs football players
Old Dominion University alumni
Green Bay Packers players
Oakland Raiders players
Jacksonville Jaguars players
Cleveland Browns players